"Parachute" is a song recorded by American singer-songwriter Chris Stapleton. It is the third single from his debut album Traveller. The song was written by Stapleton and Jim Beavers.

Content
The song is an uptempo backed by banjo and acoustic guitar, in which the narrator sings about being there for the one he loves: "Baby, I will be your parachute".

Critical reception
Billy Dukes of Taste of Country was favorable, praising the "more dynamic vocal performance" and "straight-forward arrangement", also saying that "Lyrically this isn’t quite Song of the Year material, but Stapleton’s vocals on 'Parachute' are his latest entry in a still-to-be-created Performance of the Year category."

Live performance
Stapleton sang "Parachute" live at the CMT Music Awards in June 2016, with assistance from Dave Cobb, Mickey Raphael, Robby Turner, and Stapleton's wife, Morgane.

Commercial performance
The song has sold 248,000 copies in the US as of December 2016.

Charts

Weekly charts

Year-end charts

Certifications

References

2016 singles
Country ballads
2010s ballads
Mercury Nashville singles
Chris Stapleton songs
Songs written by Chris Stapleton
Songs written by Jim Beavers
Song recordings produced by Dave Cobb
2015 songs